Sixteen Oceans is the tenth studio album by British electronic musician Kieran Hebden, released under his alias Four Tet on 13 March 2020. The album contains the previously released single "Teenage Birdsong". To support the album, another single named "Baby", featuring vocals by British singer Ellie Goulding, was released on 23 January 2020. A third single titled "4T Recordings" was released on 3 March 2020.

Announcement
On 21 January 2020, Four Tet posted an image on his Instagram account of a Post-it note with the title and the track listing of the album, and the message "new album released March 2020".

Track listing

Notes
"Baby" features vocals by Ellie Goulding.

Charts

References

2020 albums
Four Tet albums
Text Records albums
Albums produced by Kieran Hebden